is the 39th single by Zard and released 24 November 2004 under B-Gram Records label. The single debuted at #5 rank first week. It charted for 7 weeks and sold over 33,000 copies.

Track list
All songs are written by Izumi Sakai
Kyō wa Yukkuri Hanasō
composer: Aika Ohno/arrangement: Akihito Tokunaga
Ohno, Aya Kamiki and Shinichiro Ohta (doa) were participating in chorus part
Awai Yuki ga Tokete
composer: Hiroshi Terao/arrangement: Tokunaga
Ame ga Furidasu Mae ni
composer: Yuuichirou Awai (U-ka Saegusa in dB)/arrangement: Takeshi Hayama
Kyou wa Yukkuri Hanasou (original karaoke)

References

2004 singles
Zard songs
Songs written by Izumi Sakai
Songs written by Aika Ohno
2004 songs